The Josef Škvorecký Award (Czech language: Cena Josefa Škvoreckého) is an award for the best original prose work of the preceding year. The award is named after the Czech-Canadian writer and publisher Josef Škvorecký. The prize was first awarded in 2007.

Laureates

See also
List of Czech literary awards

References 

Czech literary awards